Charles Allen Munn (1859–1924), was an American editor and publisher, who oversaw  Scientific American after the editorship of his father, Orson Desaix Munn. His nephew Orson Desaix Munn II succeeded him as editor of the magazine. He was also a patron of the arts, and after his death bequeathed his collection of early American paintings, prints, and silver to the Metropolitan Museum of Art.

References

External links

 

1859 births
1924 deaths
Scientific American people
American magazine editors